Shweta Bachchan Nanda (born 17 March 1974) is an Indian columnist, author, and former model. She has been a columnist for Daily News and Analysis and Vogue India, and is the author of the bestselling novel Paradise Towers. She has worked as a model for television advertisement, and in 2018 launched her own fashion label, MXS.

Personal life

Shweta was born to actors Amitabh Bachchan and Jaya Bachchan on 17 March 1974. Shweta married Escorts Group businessman Nikhil Nanda on 16 February 1997, who is the son of Hindi film actor-producer Raj Kapoor's daughter Ritu Nanda, and son of Rajan Nanda. The couple has two children, daughter Navya Naveli Nanda (born December 1997), and son Agastya Nanda (born November 2000). She attended Boston University.

Career
Shweta modeled for the first time in September 2006, for a magazine entitled L'Officiel India. She appeared in the seventh annual issue of the same magazine, in June 2009, with her brother Abhishek Bachchan.

In 2007, Shweta became the leader in the category – Next Generation – during NDTV Profit. A series of interviews was broadcast on the channel. Since 2018, she has been the brand ambassador for Kalyan Jewellers.

She has been a columnist with Daily News and Analysis and Vogue India. The Tribune praised her columns as "funny" and "insightful".

Along with Monisha Jaising, she launched in 2018 the fashion label MXS.

In October 2018, Shweta launched her debut novel, Paradise Towers, published by HarperCollins. The book became a bestseller despite negative reviews. Ishita Sengupta of The Indian Express reviewed the book, observing, "The novel, for all its elegance, ultimately, reads like it has a bunch of characters in search of a plot."

Shweta has also written the forewords for Aishwarya R. Dhanush's 2016 book Standing on an Apple Box: The Story of a Girl among the Stars and Rukhsana Eisa's book The Golden Code: Mastering the Art of Social Success.

Bibliography

References

External links

Living people
21st-century Indian journalists
Indian women journalists
Indian female models
Bachchan family
Place of birth missing (living people)
Indian women novelists
1974 births
Indian Hindus